National Institute of Technology Manipur (NIT Manipur or NITMN) is an Institute of National Importance situated in Imphal, Manipur, India. It is one of the 31 National Institutes of Technology in India. NIT Manipur started its first academic session in 2010.

History
The institute is one among the thirty-one NITs established as Institutions of National Importance with funding support from the Ministry of Human Resource Development. It is also one of ten new NITs established by the Ministry of Human Resource Development via its order no. F.23-13-2009-TS-III of 30 October 2009 and 3 March 2010. NIT Manipur was declared as a full-fledged NIT along with nine other new NITs, through an act of Parliament and notified under Govt. of India Gazette notification No. 28 of 2012 dated 7 June 2012 and declared as an Institute of National Importance.

Campus 
NIT Manipur is located in Langol, Imphal-795004, which is about 10 km from the Imphal International Airport.

Academics

Ranking 

NIT Manipur was ranked in the 108 band by the National Institutional Ranking Framework (NIRF) in engineering category in 2022.

Academic programmes
The institute offers courses on BTech and MTech in civil engineering, computer science engineering, electrical engineering, electronics and communication engineering and mechanical engineering. In addition, it offers MSc courses in physics, chemistry and mathematics. PhD courses also exist for various engineering, science and humanities subjects. NIT Manipur's curriculum caters to the technological needs of nearby villages and towns.

NIT Manipur's alumni have gained employment in companies, the public sector and academia. Faculty members have received research grants totaling over Rs. 5.0 crores in last 2–3 years. The institute has state-of-the-art labs, workshops and consultancy projects. The institute runs initiatives like the start-up and Atal Innovation Mission, the incubation hub and internal revenue generation (IRG).

Admission
Bachelor of Technology (B.Tech) and  admissions for Indian students is through JOSAA counselling. Until 2012 admissions were based on the All India Engineering Entrance Examination (AIEEE). From 2013 to 2016, admission was done through the JEE (MAIN); ranks were based on considering 60% of the marks scored in the test and 40% in class 12 board examinations.

Regular admissions for M.Tech is through CCMT counselling. The candidate must have a valid GATE score. Regular students admitted through CCMT are offered a stipend of 12,400 INR. The institute reserves seats for sponsored and part-time candidates where people working in industries and companies and who have more than two years of experience are given the chance to complete the M.Tech. However, they receive no stipend. Applicants from abroad are given seats for direct admission in various courses under the Direct Admission for Students Abroad (DASA) scheme.

Departments
The institute has six academic departments:
Computer Science and Engineering
Civil Engineering
Electrical Engineering
Electronics and Communication Engineering
Mechanical Engineering
Humanities and Basic Sciences

Student life

Festival
Ougri is a student-organized cultural and technical festival at NITMN that was first organised in 2013. Ougri is derived from the dance of Manipuri tradition called "Ougri Hangen Chongba". Generally, it is organised in the month of March every year.

Sports
NITMN organizes an annual sports meet usually in March. Football, kabaddi and volleyball are the major attractions. Table tennis, chess, carrom, 100 m 200 m 400 m and 800 m races are also hosted.

References

  
Education in Imphal
National Institutes of Technology
2010 establishments in Manipur
Educational institutions established in 2010
Engineering colleges in Manipur